The 2000 Intercontinental Cup, officially the 2000 Toyota European / South American Cup for sponsorship reasons, was an association football match played on 28 November 2000 between Real Madrid, winners of the 1999–2000 UEFA Champions League, and Boca Juniors, winners of the 2000 Copa Libertadores. The match was played at the neutral venue of the National Stadium in Tokyo in front of 52,511 fans. Martín Palermo was named as man of the match.

Venue

Match details

See also
1999–2000 UEFA Champions League
2000 Copa Libertadores
2000 FIFA Club World Championship
Real Madrid CF in international football competitions

References

External links
FIFA Article

Intercontinental Cup
Intercontinental Cup
Intercontinental Cup
Intercontinental Cup (football)
Intercontinental Cup 2000
Intercontinental Cup 2000
Intercontinental Cup (football) matches hosted by Japan
Inter
Sports competitions in Tokyo
November 2000 sports events in Asia
Intercontinental Cup
2000 in association football